James B. "Sandy" Taylor was an outfielder in Major League Baseball for the 1879 Troy Trojans. He played in 24 games, all as a left fielder.

Sources
 

19th-century baseball players
Major League Baseball outfielders
Troy Trojans players